The Red may refer to:

Music
 The Red (album), 2015 studio album by Red Velvet
 The Red (EP), by William Control
The Red (song), breakthrough single from the Chicago-based hard rock band Chevelle. 
 "The Red", song from Champion Sound by Jaylib

Other
 The Red, the agents of Discordia in Stephen King's The Dark Tower series
 Sport Club Internacional (The Red, Brazilian Portuguese for Colorado), the nickname of Brazilian soccer team Sport Club Internacional
 The Red (film), a 2013 film
 The Red River Gorge, a popular climbing destination in Kentucky

See also
 List of people known as the Red